McArthur River mine may refer to:
McArthur River uranium mine in Saskatchewan, Canada
McArthur River zinc mine in Northern Territory, Australia